Shaun Balfe (born 4 June 1972) is a British racing car driver from Grantham who won the 2004 Spanish GT Championship. In 2006 he raced a Saleen S7R for Balfe Motorsport
in the FIA GT Championship He currently races in the British GT Championship in a McLaren 720S GT3 with Rob Bell in 2019. He finished third in the GT3 championship that year.

Racing record

Complete British GT Championship results
(key) (Races in bold indicate pole position) (Races in italics indicate fastest lap)

† Not eligible for points.

Complete FIA GT Championship results
(key) (Races in bold indicate pole position) (Races in italics indicate fastest lap)

† Not eligible for points as a national championship entry.

References

External links
 

1972 births
Living people
People from Grantham
English racing drivers
British GT Championship drivers
FIA GT Championship drivers
International GT Open drivers
Sports car racing team owners
Team West-Tec drivers
Murphy Prototypes drivers
European Le Mans Series drivers